This is intended to be a complete list of properties and districts listed on the National Register of Historic Places in Columbia County, New York.  Seven properties and districts are further designated National Historic Landmarks.

The locations of National Register properties and districts for which the latitude and longitude coordinates are included below, may be seen in a map.



Listings county-wide

|}

Former listing

|}

See also

National Register of Historic Places listings in New York

References

External links

A useful list of the above sites, with street addresses and other information, is available at Columbia County, New York, listing, at National Register of Historic Places.Com, a private site serving up public domain information on NRHPs.

Columbia County